Kodrąbek  (formerly ) is a village in the administrative district of Gmina Wolin, within Kamień County, West Pomeranian Voivodeship, in north-western Poland. 

The village has a population of 260.

References

Villages in Kamień County